Avesta Municipality (Avesta kommun) is one of 290 municipalities of Sweden. It is in Dalarna County, in the central part of the country, and its seat is in the town of Avesta.

The municipality in its present size was created in 1967 when the four surrounding municipalities were joined with the then City of Avesta. In 1971 it became a municipality of unitary type.

Geography 
Avesta borders to the municipalities of:
 Hedemora in Dalarna,
 Hofors and Sandviken in Gävleborg County,
 Norberg and Sala in Västmanland County

Localities 
 Avesta (the seat)
 Krylbo (part of the seat Avesta.)
 Horndal
 Fors

Sports 
Speedway: The most successful sport team in Avesta is their speedway team Masarna, translating to "the men of Dalecarlia", competing in the highest division in Sweden.

Football: Avesta AIK, Krylbo IF
Ladies' handball: Avesta Brovallen HF
Ice hockey: Avesta BK

Notability 

From 1644 to 1776, Avesta was the largest part of the Swedish Mint, manufacturing mainly copper plate money. The world's largest – a 10 daler plate – is exhibited in the Avesta Myntmuseum, and weighs .

In Stubbsveden, just west of the town Avesta, is a wildlife park for European bison (wisent). Guided tours are conducted around and in between the confinements in the summer season. Occasionally, individuals from this and other Swedish animal parks are relocated to the reserve herds in Poland and Romania to widen their DNA pool.

The city's largest industry is its steel mill, today owned by the Finnish company Outokumpu Oyj. Iron production started here in the 16th century, was industrialized in the 17th, but was surpassed by the copper-plate-producing Swedish Mint factory from 1644. However, production was maintained during the centuries, and in 1823 a forge was added. In 1924, production of stainless, acid-proof, and fire-resistive steels was initiated. In the 1960s, these were still the main products, but twenty years later, the cold- and hot-rolled stainless qualities dominated. In 1991, British Steel Stainless merged with the Avesta firm, and in 2001 Outokumpu took over the majority of the ownership.

The largest Dalecarlian horse (Dalahäst) in the world is located in Avesta.

Notable natives 
 Pär Aron Borg (1776–1839), pedagogue for the blind and deaf, born in Avesta.
 Mattias Ekström, racing driver, born 1978 in Falun, raised in Snickarbo, Avesta municipality.
 Calle Jularbo, Karl Oskar Jularbo (1893–1966) born Karlsson. Accordionist and composer, raised in Östanbyn, Avesta.
 Erik Axel Karlfeldt (1864–1931), poet, author, and Nobel laureate. Born in Karlbo, Avesta.
 Marcus Kock (1585–1657), mintmaster, born in Liège, Belgium, active in Avesta from 1626.
 Nicklas Lidström, ice hockey player (NHL), born in Krylbo, Avesta municipality.
 Carl Martin Norberg, gymnast and Olympic gold medalist, born 1886 in Avesta.
 Maja Nylén Persson, ice hockey player (SDHL), born in 2000 in Avesta
 Tony Rickardsson, rally driver, and former speedway driver (six times a World Champion). Born 1970 in Avesta.
 Ola Salo, born as Rolf Ola Anders Svensson. Singer and composer, born 1977 in Avesta. Founding member of The Ark.
 Lars-Inge Svartenbrandt, criminal.
 Scar Symmetry, metal band.
 Dan Söderström, ice hockey player, born 1948 in Horndal, Avesta municipality.
 Jesper "JW" Wecksell, professional CS:GO player, playing for Fnatic.
 Tommy Vestlund, ice hockey player for the Carolina Hurricanes, born 1974 in Fors, Avesta municipality.
 Mats Åhlberg, ice hockey player, born 1947 in Avesta.

Politics

Riksdag
This table lists the national results at Avesta's municipal level since the 1972 Swedish municipality reform. The results of the Sweden Democrats from 1988 to 1998 were not published by the SCB at a municipal level due to the party's small size nationally at the time.

Blocs

This lists the relative strength of the socialist and centre-right blocs since 1973, but parties not elected to the Riksdag are inserted as "other", including the Sweden Democrats results from 1988 to 2006, but also the Christian Democrats pre-1991 and the Greens in 1982, 1985 and 1991. The sources are identical to the table above. The coalition or government mandate marked in bold formed the government after the election. New Democracy got elected in 1991 but are still listed as "other" due to the short lifespan of the party. "Elected" is the total number of percentage points from the municipality that went to parties who were elected to the Riksdag.

References

External links 

 

Municipalities of Dalarna County
Market towns in Sweden